Robert "Robbie" Thorpe is an Aboriginal Australian activist and presenter of Fire First, a program on community radio station  3CR in Melbourne.

Early life and family

Thorpe is from the Krautungalung people of the Gunnai Nation and is uncle of Senator Lidia Thorpe.

Activism 
Thorpe has campaigned for Indigenous solutions in Australia since the 1970s. He is an advocate for Pay The Rent, an Indigenous initiative set up to provide an independent economic resource for Aboriginal peoples, and the Aboriginal Passport initiative.

Inspired by Bruce McGuinness' newspaper The Koorier (1968–1971), Thorpe founded and ran the publication The Koorier 2 during the 1970s and 1980s, and later The Koorier 3, published by the Koori Information Centre.

In 1982, Thorpe challenged the Commonwealth of Australia in a case entitled Thorpe V Commonwealth for not protecting people from crimes connected to genocide. Since 2020, Robbie has been working on a court case to charge the Crown for crimes against humanity.

Radio and film 
Robbie initiated the 3CR's Fire First program with Clare Land, after appearing on her Tuesday Breakfast program with his comrade Fantom. Between 2005 and 2006 Fire First supported and fed into the Black GST (Genocide, Sovereignty, Treaty) Collective,. a campaign to end genocide, recognise Australian Aboriginal Sovereignty and make Treaty, that protested at the 2006 Commonwealth Games. In 2006, Fire First presented several live broadcasts and a daily update from Camp Sovereignty.

Thorpe has produced numerous videos to support campaigns and campaigners, including advice videos for pro-Indigenous white activists in Australia with fellow activist Gary Foley. These videos are aimed at non-Indigenous people seeking to act in solidarity with Aboriginal and Torres Strait Islander peoples.

Thorpe's speeches and interviews are frequently captured on news and for activist films and he has starred in hip hop videos and other creative productions.

 Thorpe's own story is being captured in a new documentary film, directed and produced by Anthony Kelly, entitled Our Warrior: The Story of Robbie Thorpe.

References

External links 
 
 
 

Living people
Australian radio presenters
Year of birth missing (living people)